Linger may refer to:

Linger (surname), a list of people with the name
Linger, Luxembourg, a town
Linger (film), a 2008 Hong Kong film directed by Johnnie To
Linger (novel), a 2010 Wolves of Mercy Falls novel by Maggie Stiefvater
Linger (album), a 1990 album by Prudence Liew
"Linger" (Prudence Liew song), 1990 single off the eponymous album Linger
"Linger" (The Cranberries song), 1993
"Linger" (Guy Sebastian song), 2014

See also

 
 Ling (disambiguation)
 Lingering (disambiguation)
 Lunger (disambiguation)